Jordan Levy (November 4, 1943) is an American Independent politician and talk radio host from Worcester, Massachusetts. He served as the Mayor of Worcester on two occasions, first from 1981 to 1982 and the second time from 1988 to 1993. He is the host of The Jordan Levy Show on WTAG (580-AM) from 3–6 PM on weekdays.

Early life
Levy was born in Worcester, Massachusetts on November 4, 1943.

Mayor of Worcester, Massachusetts

Plan E appointed mayor
When Levy first became mayor, Worcester had a Plan E government.  The office of mayor was a largely ceremonial office. City government in Worcester was organized as a 9-member city council (all at-large), a ceremonial mayor elected from the council by the councilors, and a council-appointed city manager. The manager oversees the daily administration of the city, makes all appointments to city offices, and can be removed at any time by a majority vote of the council. The mayor chairs the city council and the school committee, and does not have the power to veto any vote.

Elected Mayor by popular vote
In 1987 Levy was elected as mayor, he was the first popularly elected mayor in 40 years.  For the 1987 elections Worcester had changed the city charter. This "Home Rule" charter (named for the method of adoption of the charter) is similar to Plan E, the major changes being to the structure of the council and the election of the mayor. The 9-member Council became 11, 6 At-Large and 1 from each city district. The mayor is chosen by popular election, but must run as an At-Large Councilor.

Massachusetts Executive Council
In 1994 Levy was elected to the Massachusetts Executive Council Seventh Councilor District.  Levy served on from 1995 to 1998.

Massachusetts Turnpike Authority
Appointed to the Massachusetts Turnpike Authority for 7 years by Governor Paul Cellucci in 1997

Maxine Levy
On April 28, 2010, Jordan lost his wife, Maxine Levy after a battle with cancer.

External links
 Jordan Levy Show website

Notes

1943 births
American talk radio hosts
Massachusetts Independents
Mayors of Worcester, Massachusetts
Living people
Members of the Massachusetts Governor's Council
Jewish American people in Massachusetts politics
Jewish mayors of places in the United States